R50 may refer to:

Automobiles 
 BMW R50, a motorcycle
 Mini Hatch (R50), a hatchback
 Nissan Pathfinder (R50), a sport utility vehicle
 Toyota LiteAce (R50), a van
 Venucia R50, a hatchback
 Volkswagen Touareg R50, a sport utility vehicle

Other uses 
 R50 (South Africa), a road
 , a destroyer of the Royal Navy
 Methane, a refrigerant
 R50: Very toxic to aquatic organisms, a risk phrase
 R50, a commuter rail service on the Llobregat–Anoia Line, in Barcelona, Catalonia, Spain
 R50, a Ferris wheel designed by Ronald Bussink